Eois lavendula is a moth in the  family Geometridae. It is found in Peru.

References

Moths described in 1907
Taxa named by William Warren (entomologist)
Eois
Moths of South America